France competed at the 1968 Summer Paralympics in Tel Aviv, Israel from November 4 to 13, 1968. The French team contained fifty-five athletes; forty-one men and fourteen women . The team finished fifth in the medal table and won a total of thirty-two medals; thirteen gold, ten silver and nine bronze.

Medalists

Archery

Twelve French archers, ten men and two women, competed at the Games winning seven medals; two gold, one silver and four bronze. In the men's St. Nicholas round event for paraplegics France won two medals; Nadal won silver and Guesnon bronze, the gold medal was won by Arballo of United States with a new world record score of 730 points.

See also
 France at the Paralympics
 France at the 1968 Summer Olympics

Notes

References

Nations at the 1968 Summer Paralympics
1968
Paralympics